The 2002 Louisiana–Monroe Indians football team represented the University of Louisiana at Monroe as a member of the Sun Belt Conference during the 2002 NCAA Division I-A football season. The Indians began the season led by fourth-year Bobby Keasler, who resigned after the team lost its first three games. Louisiana–Monroe's defensive coordinator, Mike Collins, was appointed interim head coach for the remainder of the season. The Indians finished the year with an overall record of 3–9 and mark of 2–4 in conference play, placing in athree-way tie for fourth in the Sun Belt. Louisiana–Monroe's offense scored 236 points while the defense allowed 451 points. The team played home games at Malone Stadium in Monroe, Louisiana.

Schedule

Roster

References

Louisiana–Monroe
Louisiana–Monroe Warhawks football seasons
Louisiana–Monroe Indians football